The Green Alliance (AV) is a Spanish ecologist and eco-socialist political party, ideologically located to the left. It was created on 10 June 2021 within the Unidas Podemos electoral coalition. It has a representative in the Congress of Deputies, Juan López de Uralde, founder and former leader of Equo.

Since its inception, it has been presented to all elections within Unidas Podemos or equivalent according to region or elections.

History 
Alianza Verde was born from the people who stayed at Unidas Podemos after Equo left this space to join Más País in 2019, along with others from environmental social organizations. Although the initial intention was to launch this new party shortly after, that is, in 2020, the COVID-19 pandemic forced it to be paralyzed. It was presented on June 10, 2021 in Madrid by its federal coordinator, Juan López de Uralde, deputy and president of the Ecological Transition Commission in the Congress of Deputies, by the Andalusian coordinator Carmen Molina, former deputy of the Parliament of Andalusia, and by the coordinator of the País Valencià, the former Secretary of the Environment of the Generalitat Valenciana, Julià Álvaro. Along with them, the Executive Committee of Alianza Verde is made up, on an equal basis, by Carmen Tejero, a historical activist from Confederation of the Greens; Fernando Rodrigo, former president of ISTAS at CCOO; and by Beatriz del Hoyo, its communication manager.

The first elections in which they will participate will be the regional elections of Andalusia, scheduled for the end of 2022, as part of Unidas Podemos.

References

External links 
 
 Manifiesto fundacional "Sumar en verde": 

Political parties in Spain
Ecosocialist parties
Green political parties in Spain
Political parties established in 2021